The 1954 College Football All-America team is composed of college football players who were selected as All-Americans by various organizations and writers that chose College Football All-America Teams in 1954. The eight selectors recognized by the NCAA as "official" for the 1954 season are (1) the All-America Board (AAB), (2) the American Football Coaches Association (AFCA), (3) the Associated Press (AP), (4) the Football Writers Association of America (FWAA), (5) the International News Service (INS), (6) the Newspaper Enterprise Association (NEA), (7) the Sporting News (SN), and (8) the United Press (UP).

Wisconsin's fullback Alan Ameche won the Heisman Trophy in 1954 as the best player in college football and was a unanimous first-team selection by all eight official selectors.  Three other players were unanimous choices among the official selectors: Notre Dame's quarterback Ralph Guglielmi; Ohio State's halfback Howard "Hopalong" Cassady; and Arkansas' guard Bud Brooks.

Consensus All-Americans
For the year 1954, the NCAA recognizes eight published All-American teams as "official" designations for purposes of its consensus determinations. The following chart identifies the NCAA-recognized consensus All-Americans and displays which first-team designations they received.

All-American selections for 1954

Ends
Max Boydston, Oklahoma  (AAB, AFCA, AP-2, FWAA, INS-1, NEA-2, SN, UP-1, CP-3, WC)
Ron Beagle, Navy  (AAB, AP-1, FWAA, INS-1, NEA-1, SN, UP-2, CP-2, WC)
Don Holleder, Army  (AFCA, INS-2, NEA-1, UP-1, CP-1)
Frank McDonald, Miami (Fla.) (AP-1, FWAA, NEA-3)
Dean Dugger, Ohio State (FWAA, INS-2, NEA-2, UP-2, CP-2)
Ron Kramer, Michigan  (AP-3, INS-2, UP-3, CP-1)
Bill Walker, Maryland (AP-2)
Jim Pyburn, Auburn (AP-3 INS-2)
Dave Dickerson, Ole Miss (NEA-3)
John Kerr, Purdue (CP-3)
Dan Shannon, Notre Dame (UP-3)

Tackles
Jack Ellena, UCLA (AAB, AFCA, AP-1, INS-1, NEA-1, SN, UP-1, CP-1, WC)
Sid Fournet, LSU (AFCA, AP-2, FWAA, INS-1, NEA-1, UP-1, CP-2, WC)
Frank Varrichione, Notre Dame  (AP-3, INS-2, NEA-3, SN, UP-2, CP-1)
Rex Boggan, Mississippi (AP-1)
Darris McCord, Tennessee (FWAA)
Art Walker, Michigan  (AAB, FWAA, NEA-3, UP-3)
Jim Ray Smith, Baylor (AP-2, UP-2)
Tom Jones, Miami (OH) (INS-2, NEA-2, CP-3)
Bob Bartholomew, Wake Forest (NEA-2)
Eldred Kraemer, Pitt (INS-2, CP-2)
Dick Hilinski, Ohio State (AP-3)
Bruce Bosley, West Virginia (CP-3)
Francis Machinsky, Ohio State (UP-3)

Guards
Bud Brooks, Arkansas (AAB, AFCA, AP-1, FWAA, INS-1, NEA-1, SN, UP-1, CP-2, WC)
Cal Jones, Iowa (College Football Hall of Fame) (AAB, AP-2, FWAA, INS-2, NEA-1, SN, UP-1, CP-1, WC)
Tom Bettis, Purdue  (FWAA, INS-1, NEA-2, UP-2, CP-1)
Ralph Chesnauskas, Army (AP-1, UP-3)
Jim Salsbury, UCLA (AFCA, AP-3, FWAA, INS-2, NEA-2, UP-2, CP-3)
Frank Mincevich, South Carolina (FWAA)
William Meigs, Harvard (AP-2)
Gene Lamone, West Virginia (AP-3, NEA-3, CP-2)
Ken Paul, Rice (NEA-3)
Jan Smid, Illinois (CP-3)
Franklin Brooks, Georgia Tech (UP-3)

Centers
Kurt Burris, Oklahoma (AFCA, AP-1, FWAA, INS-2, NEA-1, SN, UP-1, CP-1, WC)
Hal Easterwood, Mississippi State (AP-2, FWAA, INS-2, NEA-2)
Matt Hazeltine, California  (INS-1, UP-3)
Hugh Pitts, TCU (CP-2)
Leon Cunningham, South Carolina (AP-3, NEA-3)
Larry Morris, Georgia Tech (UP-2, CP-3)

Quarterbacks
Ralph Guglielmi, Notre Dame  (AAB, AFCA, AP-1, FWAA, INS-1, NEA-1, SN, UP-1, CP-1, WC)
Paul Larson, California (AP-2, FWAA, INS-2, NEA-2, UP-2, CP-3)
George Shaw, Oregon (AP-3, INS-2, NEA-3, UP-2)
Pete Vann, Army (INS-2, UP-3, CP-2)
Len Dawson, Purdue (AP-3, UP-3)
Buddy Leake, Oklahoma (CP-3)

Halfbacks
Howard Cassady, (College Football Hall of Fame)Ohio State  (AAB, AFCA, AP-1, FWAA, INS-1, NEA-1, SN, UP-1, CP-1, WC)
Dicky Moegle, Rice  (AAB, AFCA, AP-1, FWAA, INS-2, NEA-1, SN, UP-1, CP-2, WC)
Tommy Bell, Army (FWAA, INS-1, NEA-2)
Lenny Moore, Penn State  (AP-3, CP-1, NEA-2, UP-3)
Bob McNamara, Minnesota (AP-2, FWAA, INS-2, NEA-3, UP-2, CP-3)
Frank Bernardi, Colorado (AP-2)
Primo Villanueva, UCLA (UP-2)
Corky Tharp, Alabama (INS-2)
Corky Taylor, Kansas State (INS-2)
Bob Watkins, Ohio State (CP-2)
Robert A. Pascal, Duke (AP-3)
Carroll Hardy, Colorado (NEA-3)
Hubert Bobo, Ohio State (CP-3)

Fullbacks
Alan Ameche, Wisconsin (AAB, AFCA, AP-1, FWAA, INS-1, NEA-1, SN, UP-1, CP-1, WC)
Bob Davenport, UCLA (AP-2, FWAA, INS-2, NEA-2, UP-3, CP-2)
Henry Moore, Arkansas (NEA-3)

Key

Official selectors

Other selectors

See also
 1954 All-Atlantic Coast Conference football team
 1954 All-Big Seven Conference football team
 1954 All-Big Ten Conference football team
 1954 All-Pacific Coast Conference football team
 1954 All-SEC football team
 1954 All-Southwest Conference football team

References

All-America Team
College Football All-America Teams